Héctor Eduardo Babenco (February 7, 1946July 13, 2016) was an Argentine-Brazilian film director, screenwriter, producer and actor who worked in several countries including Brazil, Argentina, and the United States. He was one of the first Brazilian filmmakers to gain international critical acclaim, through his films which often dealt with social outcasts on the fringes of society. His best-known works include Pixote (1980), Kiss of the Spider Woman (1985), Ironweed (1987), At Play in the Fields of the Lord (1990) and Carandiru (2003).

Babenco's films brought him several accolades. He was nominated three times for the Palme d'Or of the Cannes Film Festival, and was nominated for an Academy Award for Best Director for Kiss of the Spider Woman. He won the Grande Prêmio do Cinema Brasileiro twice, and the Prêmio ACIE de Cinema once.

Early life
Babenco was born in Buenos Aires and raised in Mar del Plata. His mother, Janka Haberberg, was a Polish Jewish immigrant, and his father, Jaime Babenco, was an Argentine gaucho of Ukrainian Jewish origin. Babenco lived in Europe from 1964 to 1968. In 1969, he decided to stay in São Paulo, Brazil, permanently.

Career 
His first solo feature film as a director was O Rei da Noite (King of the Night) (1975), starring Paulo José and Marília Pêra.

Babenco had an international success with Pixote – A lei do mais fraco (1981).  It concerns Brazil's abandoned children. In the words of E. Ruby Rich while it concerns "a pair of boys who form a symbiotic sexual union", the film cannot "be held up as an example of how gay desire can be depicted, given its sensationalistic and sordid treatment of gay sex as accommodation, substitution, and punishment". The film featured impressive work of young actor Fernando Ramos da Silva, 10 years old at the time, who was discovered in the suburbs of São Paulo. The film received numerous prizes, including nomination for Best Foreign Film at the 1982 Golden Globes Awards.

For Kiss of the Spider Woman (1985), Babenco was nominated for the Academy Award for Best Director, the first Latin American to be nominated in this category.

He directed some of the most respected American actors of his time, including William Hurt, John Lithgow, Raul Julia, Jack Nicholson, Meryl Streep, Tom Berenger, Daryl Hannah, Aidan Quinn and Kathy Bates.

In 2012 Babenco was part of the jury in the 34th Moscow International Film Festival.

His last film was My Hindu Friend (2016), which stars Willem Dafoe. It recounts the story of a film director close to death.

Personal life 
In 2010, Barbenco married actress Bárbara Paz. He was previously married to Xuxa Lopes and Raquel Arnaud. He was the father of two daughters, Janka Babenco and Myra Arnaud Babenco, from his previous marriages, and also had two grandchildren.

Health issues and death 
In 1994, Babenco fell ill and had to undergo a bone marrow transplant to treat a lymphatic cancer, a diagnosis which he had since he was 38 years old.

On July 12, 2016, Babenco was admitted to Hospital Sírio-Libanês to treat sinusitis. The following night, he suffered a cardiac arrest, and died shortly thereafter.

Filmography

Documentaries

Television

Acting roles

Awards and nominations

References

External links

 
 

1946 births
2016 deaths
People from Buenos Aires
Argentine emigrants to Brazil
Male screenwriters
Brazilian film directors
Brazilian film producers
Brazilian screenwriters
Brazilian Jews
Brazilian people of Polish-Jewish descent
Brazilian people of Ukrainian-Jewish descent
Argentine film directors
Argentine film producers
Argentine screenwriters
Argentine Jews
Argentine people of Polish-Jewish descent
Argentine people of Ukrainian-Jewish descent
Jewish Brazilian male actors
Jewish Argentine male actors
People from Mar del Plata
Naturalized citizens of Brazil
People with acquired Brazilian citizenship